is a private women's college in Higashiyama-ku, Kyoto, Kyoto, Japan. The school's predecessor was founded in 1899, and it was chartered as a university in 1949.

The school's nickname is 京女(kyojo).

External links
 Official website 

Educational institutions established in 1899
Private universities and colleges in Japan
Universities and colleges in Kyoto Prefecture
1899 establishments in Japan
Women's universities and colleges in Japan